Glenea bankoi is a species of beetle in the family Cerambycidae. It was described by Garreau in 2011.

References

bankoi
Beetles described in 2011